Brock High School is located in Cannington, Ontario. It is the northernmost high school in the Durham District School Board.
Brock High School serves families from the towns of Cannington, Beaverton, Sunderland, and the rural families of Brock Township.  It is the northmost high school in the Durham District School Board. The school has students in Grades 9 through 12.
 	
The school is located on the south side of the 12th concession of Brock Township approximately 1.5 kilometres west of the town of Cannington.

Brock High School has approximately 50 full-time and part-time teaching staff.

History
The school was based on designs by Shore & Moffat Architects, and was constructed in 1952.  Classes began in 1953.  The school has experienced four major architectural expansions to cater to the growing needs of the rural communities it serves.

See also
List of high schools in Ontario

References

External links
Official web site

High schools in the Regional Municipality of Durham
1953 establishments in Ontario
Educational institutions established in 1953